Tegenaria montana is a funnel-web spider found in Bulgaria.

See also 
 List of Agelenidae species

References

External links 

montana
Spiders of Europe
Spiders described in 1993